Sternohammus yunnanus is a species of beetle in the family Cerambycidae. It was described by Wang and Jiang in 1998, originally under the genus Sternohammus. It is known from China.

References

Lamiini
Beetles described in 1998